Zoukou may refer to several places in Benin:

Zoukou, Djidja
Zoukou, Zogbodomey